The Ministers is a 2009 film starring John Leguizamo and Harvey Keitel. It premiered in the US in theaters on October 16, 2009.

Plot
Thirteen years after her father was slain and the only evidence left at the crime scene was a pamphlet for a secret shrouded religious order known as “The Ministers”, a New York City homicide detective sets out to discover the truth behind her father's gruesome death, but unwittingly becomes involved with one of his killers.

Cast
 John Leguizamo as Dante & Perfecto Mendoza
 Florencia Lozano as Celeste Santana
 Harvey Keitel as Bruno
 Diane Venora as Gina Santana
 Wanda De Jesus as Captain Diaz
 Manny Pérez as Detective Manso
 John Hilner as Jeff Kane
 Saul Stein as Detective DeMarco
 Raquel Castro as Nereida
 Adrian Martinez as Mike

The film also features Quinton Aaron in a small role.

References

External links
 
 

2009 films
2000s crime films
2000s English-language films
American crime films
2000s American films